"(She Was A) Hotel Detective" is a song and single by alternative rock band They Might Be Giants. It was released as a single on May 5, 1988, two years after the release of They Might Be Giants, the album on which it originally appeared. The "Hotel Detective" title has become a somewhat recurring theme for the band.

As in the single release of "Don't Let's Start", the version of the song on the "Hotel Detective" single is slightly different from the album version. In this case, a drum track fades in to open the song, and Linnell's saxophone is more prominent. Additionally, Peter Pearmain Thomson sings backing vocals, whereas on the album, the backing vocals are sung by John Flansburgh.

The entire contents of the EP also appear on the compilation album Miscellaneous T. The track "Kiss Me, Son of God" went on to be re-recorded and released on the band's 1988 album, Lincoln. Neither the CD release nor the 12" release of the EP list the untitled track in their respective track listings. The track consists of a conversation recorded on Dial-A-Song's answering machine between a listener known only as "Gloria" and an unknown male.

"Hotel Detective" series
The song "(She Was A) Hotel Detective", which was written by John Flansburgh, first appeared on They Might Be Giants, the band's debut album. It was later followed up by "She Was a Hotel Detective", which appeared on an EP, Back to Skull, released in 1994. The sequel was written by John Linnell, "in the tradition of 'Peggy Sue Got Married' and 'Let's Twist Again'". The lyrics to "She Was A Hotel Detective" (the sequel) include the phrase "motel directive", which is transcribed between the leadout grooves of the original Hotel Detective vinyl EP.

A second sequel, "(She Was A) Hotel Detective in the Future", was released on the band's podcast, and subsequently on a CD compilation of songs from the podcast, Cast Your Pod to the Wind. This final sequel was followed by a fake "commentary track" for the song, which was actually far longer than the song itself.

Music video 
The music video for "(She Was A) Hotel Detective" was directed by Adam Bernstein. Some portions of the video show cartoons of the two Johns, animated by Joey Ahlbum. The video is split between these animated segments and segments of John Flansburgh and John Linnell performing the song in a dark room in front of a large "ROCK MUSIC" sign. The video is intentionally over-indulgent, but John and John were unhappy with the final result.

Joey Ahlbum's animated versions of John Linnell and John Flansburgh from the "(She Was A) Hotel Detective" music video were used in the first episode of the 1991 sitcom Clarissa Explains It All to show that Clarissa liked Linnell (referred to as "John, the one without glasses"). The figures were also used by Bar/None on promotional postcards.

Track listing
All tracks by They Might Be Giants.

CD track listing

12" track listing

Personnel 
They Might Be Giants
 John Flansburgh – vocals, guitar
 John Linnell – vocals, bass saxophone, baritone saxophone, synthesizers, accordion

Additional musicians
 Lt. Anne Moore – vocals
 Peter Pearmain Thomson – backup vocals

Production
 Al Houghton – engineer
 Bill Krauss – producer
 Mark Marek – cover art
 Rita Zaitschek – cover production

References

External links
 (She Was A) Hotel Detective EP at This Might Be A Wiki
 "(She Was A) Hotel Detective" (song) at This Might Be A Wiki

Songs about hotels and motels
Songs written by John Flansburgh
They Might Be Giants songs
Rough Trade Records singles
Songs written by John Linnell
1988 songs